George M. Reischmann (August 16, 1860 – February 7, 1922) was an American furniture manufacturer and politician from New York.

Life 
Reischmann was born on August 16, 1860, in New York City, the son of Michael and Madeline Reischmann. Michael was a German immigrant from Steinalben who immigrated to America in 1850, fought in the American Civil War, and established a furniture manufacturing company.

Reischmann lived in the eastern district of Brooklyn since 1872. He began working for his father in 1880 and learned about cabinet making. He spent the next several years working in his father's company in various capacities. In 1893, he and his brothers joined their father's furniture manufacturing firm as Reischmann & Sons. When his father died, he became head of the company.

In January 1920, Reischmann retired from the company. Later that year, he was elected to the New York State Senate as a Republican, representing New York's 9th State Senate district. He served in the Stat Senate in 1921 and 1922.

Reischmann's wife's name was Catherine. Their children were George and Lillian. He was a member of the Royal Arcanum, the Owls, the Bushwick and Unity Republican clubs, and the Ridgewood Board of Trade.

Reischmann died of diabetes on February 7, 1922, in Jeffersonville, New York. He was buried in St. John's Cemetery.

References

External links 

 The Political Graveyard

1860 births
1922 deaths
Businesspeople from Brooklyn
Politicians from Brooklyn
American people of German descent
19th-century American businesspeople
20th-century American businesspeople
American manufacturing businesspeople
American business executives
20th-century American politicians
Republican Party New York (state) state senators
Burials at St. John's Cemetery (Queens)
Deaths from diabetes